The Third Border Initiative (TBI) is an area of policy concerning United States and the Caribbean region. The phrase was especially made popular by the administration of US president George W. Bush. The Third Border Initiative was a reference to the Caribbean region's adjacent placement to the United States. The policy is the ideology that behind Canada and Mexico the Caribbean region is a sea-based border of the United States.

Overview
The initiative also builds upon the founding of the Caribbean/United States - Partnership for Prosperity and Security in the Caribbean (1997). An agreement which is sometimes called the "Bridgetown Accord". This agreement is also complemented with other agreements for Maritime co-operation between the United States and countries of the Caribbean region. These other agreements include: the Maritime Counter-Narcotics Co-operation Agreement (1996), the Maritime Counter-Narcotics ("Shiprider") Agreement (1997), and the Western Hemisphere Travel Initiative. Many of these agreements were signed between the Clinton Administration of the United States, and the various independent countries of the Caribbean region in May 1997.

See also
Canada–United States border
Caribbean Basin Initiative (CBI)
Caribbean Basin Trade Partnership Act (CBTPA)
Caribbean Regional Maritime Agreement
Free Trade Area of the Americas
Caribbean Community (CARICOM)

Notes

References

External links
White House: Fact Sheet President's Speech at the Summit of the Americas
White House: Fact Sheet Caribbean Third Border Initiative
Joint Statement by the United States of America, the Caribbean Community (CARICOM) and the Dominican Republic on the Third Border Initiative - Washington, DC (13 January 2004)
Terrorism and security in the caribbean before and after 9/11, Dion E. Phillips
U.S./CARICOM/Dominican Republic Statement on Third Border Initiative - America. Gov (4 January 2004)
USAID: Caribbean Regional
 Caribbean/United States - Partnership for Prosperity and Security in the Caribbean - Text document of agreement signed between the United States and Caribbean region at Bridgetown, Barbados on 10 May 1997.

Geography of the Caribbean
Borders of the United States
United States–Caribbean relations
Bahamas–United States border
Cuba–United States border